Fourth Lake (Nova Scotia) could mean the following :

Municipality of Clare

 Fourth Lake Flowage  located at

Halifax Regional Municipality

 Fourth Lake  located at 
 Fourth Lake  located at 
 Fourth Lake  located at 
 Fourth Lake  located at 
 Fourth Lake  located at

Municipality of the District of Staint Mary's

 Fourth Lake located at 
 Fourth Lake  located at

References
Geographical Names Board of Canada
Explore HRM
Nova Scotia Placenames

Lakes of Nova Scotia